Abihail may refer to one of five different people mentioned in the Bible:

 Abihail the Levite lived during the time of the wandering of the Israelites in the wilderness.  He was the head of the house of Merari and Levi's youngest son. (Numbers 3:35)
 Abihail was the wife of Abishur of the tribe of Judah. (I Chronicles 2:29)
 Abihail, from Gilead of Bashan,  was head of the tribe of Gad. (I Chronicles 5:14)
 Abihail was the daughter of David's brother Eliab. She was married to David's son Jerimoth and became mother of Rehoboam's wife Mahalath. (II Chronicles 11:18)
 Abihail  was the father of Queen Esther and uncle of Mordecai. (Esther 2:15; Esther 9:29)

References
"Abihail", International Standard Bible Encyclopedia.

Women in the Hebrew Bible
Gilead